William Hilton may refer to:
 William Hilton (painter), British portrait and history painter
 William Hilton Jr, English explorer
 William Hilton (Irish politician), Irish politician, barrister and judge
 William Hilton (British politician), British politician and trade unionist